Redmi Note 9 is a line of Android-based smartphones as part of the Redmi Note series by Redmi, a sub-brand of Xiaomi Inc.

Specifications

Hardware

Design

Note 9 

The Note 9/10X 4G measures  and weighs  which is heavier than usual for a 6.53 inch phone. The curved (slippery) back feels like glass, the front is made of Gorilla Glass 5, and the frame is made of plastic. The bottom half is heavier to prevent the device from tipping over and falling. The bezels and the camera bump are small.

In addition to the  touchscreen, it has a power button and a volume up/down button located on the right side, an IR blaster on the top, and a USB-C port, a downward-firing speaker, and a headphone jack on the bottom. It has a hole punch in the left corner and a fingerprint scanner in the rear.

The Note 9/10X 4G has three colour options: Forest Green, Midnight Grey, and Polar White.

Note 9S/Pro (India) 
The Note 9S/Pro (India) measures  and weighs . The curved (slippery) back and the front is made of Gorilla Glass 5, and the matte frame is made of plastic. The bezels are small, however, the phone does wobble because of a camera bump raising the phone. It is also splash-proof and has a P2i water repellent coating.

In addition to the  touchscreen, it has a power/fingerprint scanner button and a volume up/down button located on the right side, microSD slot in the left side, an IR blaster on the top, and a USB-C port, a downward-firing speaker, and a headphone jack on the bottom. It has an earpiece above the display, and a notification LED.

The Note 9S/Pro (India) has three colour options: Aurora Blue, Glacier White, and Interstellar Gray.

Note 9 Pro (global)/Pro Max 
The Note 9 Pro (global) measures . For the Note 9 Pro Max, it measures . Both of them weigh . The curved back with a gloss finish and the front is made of Gorilla Glass 5, and the frame is made of plastic. The bezels, which are always painted in black, are small (except the chin at the bottom), however, the phone does wobble because of a camera bump raising the phone. It is also splash-proof and has a P2i water repellent coating.

In addition to the  touchscreen, it has a power/fingerprint scanner button and a volume up/down button located on the right side, SIM card and microSD slot in the left side (triple slot), an IR blaster on the top, and a USB-C port, a downward-firing speaker, and a headphone jack on the bottom. It has an earpiece and a notification LED above the display.

The Note 9 Pro (global)/Pro Max has three color options: Tropical Green, Glacier White, and Interstellar Gray.

POCO M2 Pro 
The POCO M2 Pro measures  and weighs . The curved back with a gloss finish and the front is made of Gorilla Glass 5, and the matte frame is made of plastic. It has a striped pattern on the phone that takes up two-thirds of the rear, which resembles the original Google Pixel.

In addition to the  touchscreen, it has a recessed power/fingerprint scanner button and a volume up/down button located on the right side, microSD slot, an IR blaster, and a USB-C port, a downward-firing speaker, and a headphone jack.

The POCO M2 Pro has three colour options: Out Of The Blue, Green and Greener, and Two Shades of Black.

Chipset 
The Note 9 uses the octa-core MediaTek Helio G85 containing 2 2GHz Cortex-A75 core, 6 1.8GHz Cortex-A55 core, and an 1GHz Mali-G52 MC2 GPU), which is a small revision of the MediaTek Helio G80. The GPU's difference is the GPU clock at 950 MHz on the MediaTek Helio G80, and 1 GHz on the MediaTek Helio G85.

The rest of the series uses the octa-core Qualcomm Snapdragon 720G which contains 22.3 GHz Kryo 465 Gold core, 6 1.8GHz Kryo 465 Silver core, and an Adreno 618 GPU.

Display 
The Note 9 has a  2340x1080 1080p (395ppi with 19.5:9 aspect ratio), 16M colors, Gorilla Glass 5, and IPS LCD display with 1242:1 contrast ratio, 370 nits of brightness with 100% brightness, and up to 466 nits with Auto mode turned on.

The rest of the series has a slightly larger display, at  2400x1080 with a 20:9 aspect ratio, rated for 1500:1 contrast ratio and 450nits of brightness, and has support for HDR10. In the POCO M2 Pro, there is a daylight mode that triggers once the phone detects bright lighting. The mode increases the saturation and contrast of the display. The mode reduces colour accuracy and makes the colours unnatural, especially when playing games or looking at pictures.

The Note 9S/Pro (India) has 421nits of brightness with 100% brightness, up to 575nits of brightness with Auto mode turned on, and 1369-1389:1 contrast ratio. The Note 9 Pro (global)/Pro Max has 456 nits of brightness with 100% brightness, up to 616nits of brightness with Auto mode turned on, and a 1265-1285:1 contrast ratio.

Camera 
The Note 9 uses a quad rear camera array, which is a 48MP ƒ/1.8 26mm 1/2" 0.8µm main camera with PDAF, an 8MP ƒ/2.2 13mm 1/4" 1.12µm 118˚ ultra-wide camera, a 2MP ƒ/2.4 1/5" 1.75µm macro camera with autofocus, and an 2MP ƒ/2.4 depth sensor camera. It also has a 13 MP ƒ/2.3 29mm 1/3.1" 1.12µm front camera. It can shoot at 1080p/30fps with the rear camera and the front camera.

The Note 9S/Pro (India)/POCO M2 Pro has the macro camera upgraded to 5MP, and the ultra-wide camera slightly wider at 119˚. It also has a 16MP f/2.5 1/3.06" 1µm front camera, and can shoot at 4K/30fps, 1080p/60/120fps, and 720p/960fps with the rear camera, 1080p/120fps with the front camera, and has gyro-EIS.

The Note 9 Pro (global)/Pro Max has the main camera upgraded to a 64MP ƒ/1.9 26mm 1/1.72" 0.8µm main camera, and the Note 9 Pro Max has a 32MP 1/2.8" 0.8µm front camera.

Battery 
The entire line uses a non-removable 5020mAh Li-Po battery, except for the POCO M2 Pro which uses a slightly smaller non-removable 5000mAh Li-Po battery. The Note 9/9S/Pro (India) has 18W fast charging, the Note 9 Pro (global) and the Note 9 Pro Max has 30W fast charging, and the POCO M2 Pro has 33W fast charging.

Software

User interface 

The series is powered by Android, a Linux-based, open-source mobile operating system developed by Google and introduced commercially in 2008. Among other features, the software allows users to maintain customized home screens, which can contain shortcuts to applications and widgets for displaying information. Shortcuts to frequently used applications can be stored on a dock at the bottom of the screen. A tray accessed by dragging from the top of the screen allows users to view notifications received from other apps. It contains toggle switches for commonly used functions.

The series uses MIUI 12.5.1 based on Android 11. MIUI 12.5 has a minimalistic design and some elements of the original Android, such as the toggle switches in the notification tray, and the app drawer in some markets. The app drawer can be customized, such as sorting different apps into categories, and the colour of the background. MIUI 12.5 also supports dark mode, making the system background turn black, and icons darken as well, reading mode, and night mode. The notification tray can be customized, such as the looks of the notification cards. MIUI 12.5 also has per-app background activity control. The task switcher shows all of the opened apps in two columns. MIUI 12.5 has split-screen capability accessible through pressing and holding an application in the task switcher.

Features and apps 
MIUI 12.5 is a slight improvement over MIUI 12 and comes as an intermediary between MIUI 12 and the forthcoming MIUI 13. It has notification and alarm sounds that change their sounds depending on the time. MIUI 12.5 continues to have Mi's own gallery, music, video player, and document viewer. There is a paid option for streaming in the music and video player in some markets. MIUI 12.5 also has a Security app, which scans for malware, clears RAM space, manages permissions, quota usage, and battery-draining apps. In some countries, the first-party applications will show ads. This is one way Xiaomi manages to lower the cost of their phones.

Reception

Redmi Note 9 
GSMArena rated the phone 3/5 stars. They praised the sturdy design, the battery life, the Night Mode, the AF on the macro camera, the headphone jack, microSD card slot, the IR blaster, and the feature-rich OS. They criticized the mediocre display, the performance, the overall camera quality, the lack of 4K recording, the slow UI, and the charging speed.

Redmi Note 9S/Pro/Pro Max 
TechRadar reviewer Aakash Jhaveri and Tom Bedford gave the Note 9S / Pro (India) a 4/5 star rating, stating that the phone was a "killer deal for the price" despite the conservatism of the Note 9S (no 90Hz or more display, no next-gen cameras, no 30W+ fast charging, and no unique design). They praised the long battery life, the performance. They criticized the buggy pre-release software, the notifications from the pre-installed apps, and the speaker.

GSMArena rated the series (except Redmi Note 9) 3.8/5 stars. They praised the screen, the battery, the performance for the price, good image quality for the cost, the design, and the availability of NFC (Note 9 Pro (global) / Pro Max only). They criticized the uneven lighting around the hole punch, the lack of NFC (Note 9S/Pro (India)), and the charging speed (Note 9S/Pro (India)).

References

External links
 

Phablets
Redmi smartphones
Mobile phones introduced in 2020
Mobile phones with multiple rear cameras
Mobile phones with 4K video recording
Mobile phones with infrared transmitter
Discontinued smartphones